Alberbury with Cardeston is a civil parish in Shropshire, England.  It contains 58 listed buildings that are recorded in the National Heritage List for England.  Of these, one is listed at Grade I, the highest of the three grades, seven are at Grade II*, the middle grade, and the others are at Grade II, the lowest grade.  The parish contains the villages and settlements of Alberbury, Cardeston, Wollaston, Halfway House, and Rowton, and is otherwise rural.  In the parish the listed buildings include two ruined castles, two country houses and associated structures including lodges, and three churches and items in the churchyards.  Most of the other listed buildings are houses, cottages, farmhouses and farm buildings, and the rest include the remains of a windmill, two milestones, a public house, and a war memorial.  Three of the listed buildings are also Scheduled Monuments.


Key

Buildings

References

Citations

Sources

Lists of buildings and structures in Shropshire